STR, Inc. is a division of CoStar Group that provides market data on the hotel industry worldwide, including supply and demand and market share data. The company has a corporate headquarters in Hendersonville, Tennessee, an international headquarters in London, England and offices in Italy, Dubai, Brazil, Singapore, Tokyo, Jakarta, Sydney, and Beijing.

STR currently tracks 67,000 hotels with over 8 million rooms in 180 countries.

The company is also the publisher of HotelNewsNow, a website with news on the hotel industry, headquartered in Rocky River, Ohio.

It is also the sponsor of the Hotel Data Conference.

History
STR was founded in 1985 as Smith Travel Research by Randell A. Smith and his wife Carolyn Smith from their kitchen table in Lancaster, Pennsylvania.

They developed a database with names, addresses and phone numbers of hotels in the United States to create the Census Database. Randy Smith was contacted by Holiday Inn multiple times and urged to create a market share report.

In 1988, the company launched the first Smith Travel Accommodations Report (STAR), a monthly report that includes data from hotels and measures each property's market share performance against a self-selected competitive set.

In 2008, the company expanded internationally by acquiring HotelBenchmark, a division of Deloitte, and The Bench.

In 2008, the company launched HotelNewsNow, a website with news on the hotel industry.

In 2010, in partnership with Baird, the company launched the Baird / Smith Travel Research Hotel Stock Index, a stock market index which tracks the stock performance of 15 publicly traded companies in the hotel industry.

 In 2016, STR acquired LJ Research, a market research agency, which was rebranded as Tourism Consumer Insights. LJ Research was based in Edinburgh, Scotland, and established in 1998. Lynn Jones, who led the Edinburgh and Lothian Tourist Board's research division, created a spin-off company, LJ Research. Two of LJ Research's products were Visitrac, the company's online survey system that is used for customer feedback, and LJ Forecaster, a hotel benchmarking system that monitored trends based on achieved and future performance.

In October 2019, the company was acquired by CoStar Group for $450 million.

References

External links
 STR
 HotelNewsNow.com
 Hotel Data Conference
 Latest Hospitality Updates
 Real Time Travel Updates

1985 establishments in Tennessee
2019 mergers and acquisitions
American companies established in 1985
American corporate subsidiaries
Companies based in Tennessee
Hospitality companies established in 1985
Travel and holiday companies of the United States
Sumner County, Tennessee
Travel-related organizations